Lygosoma veunsaiense is a species of skink that is endemic to northeastern Cambodia. Its description as a new species was published in 2012, receiving both local and international publicity.

Discovery
In 2010, at the remote rainforest area of Veun Sai-Siem Pang Conservation Area in Ratanakiri Province, Cambodia a Fauna and Flora International herpetologist, Thy Neang, first discovered Lygosoma veunsaiense.
Peter Geissler from Museum Koenig in Germany, was one of the authors who described the skink.

Description
This type of lizard has iridescent rainbow skin with a long tail and short legs. The outer ear opening is absent; supranasals distinct and separated from each other by frontonasal; supranasals not fused with nasals; midbody scales in 22 rows; fontoparietals paired; five supralabial scales; a light stripe present on outer edge of the dorsum; and a dark dorsolateral stripe present, from behind the eye to the tail.

Habitat
Lygosoma veunsaiense spends most of its life underground in the rainforest.

References

External links

Lygosoma
Endemic fauna of Cambodia
Reptiles of Cambodia
Reptiles described in 2012
Taxa named by Peter Geissler
Taxa named by Timo Hartmann
Taxa named by Thy Neang
Taxobox binomials not recognized by IUCN